The Taipei Fish Market is a fish market in Zhongshan District, Taipei, Taiwan.

History
The fish market was originally a traditional fish market. In 2012, it was redeveloped into a more modern fish market by Mitsui Food and Beverage Enterprise Group.

Architecture
The market features some seafood restaurants.

Transportation
The market is accessible within walking distance North West from Zhongshan Junior High School Station of the Taipei Metro.

See also
 List of tourist attractions in Taiwan

References

External links
  

Fish markets
Tourist attractions in Taipei